Bypass Hill is a hill,  high, situated on the ridge at the junction of Tucker Glacier and Trafalgar Glacier in Victoria Land. It was named by the New Zealand Geological Survey Antarctic Expedition, 1957–58, who established a survey station at this point.

References
 

Hills of Victoria Land
Borchgrevink Coast